The Darkhold is a grimoire in the Marvel Universe.

Darkhold may also refer to:

 Darkhold (Marvel Cinematic Universe)
 Castle Darkhold, a place in Forgotten Realms

See also
The Diamond of Darkhold, a 2008 science fiction novel by Jeanne Duprau